Maho Nonami (野波麻帆 Nonami Maho born 13 May 1980 in Tokyo, Japan) is a Japanese actress, best known for her role in the critically acclaimed 2LDK.

Filmography

Film
 1997 Rebirth of Mothra II, Yuna
 1998 Begging for Love (aka Ai o kou hito), Migusa Yamaoka
 2001 Kakashi (案山子) (aka Scarecrow), Kaoru Yoshikawa
 2001 Puratonikku sekusu (aka Platonic Sex), Akemi Yamaguchi
 2002 2LDK, Lana
 2003 Summer Nude
 2003 Keep on Rocking
 2004 Mondai no nai watashitachi, Akane Kato
 2005 Su-ki-da
 2018 The Lies She Loved
 2020 The Asadas
 2022 Even If This Love Disappears From the World Tonight
 2022 Roleless, Riho

Television
 1999 Second Chance, (Episode 3)
 2002 Tobo (aka Escape)
 2003 Dollhouse, Ayumi
 2004 Kaseifu ha mita! 22, Eri Itonaga
 2008 4 Shimai Tantei Dan, Horie Ryoko (ep4)
 2011 Kaseifu no Mita

References

External links

JMDb Profile (in Japanese)
Official Homepage (in Japanese)

1980 births
Living people
Japanese actresses